Hlodvir Thorfinnsson (Old Norse: Hlǫðvir Þorfinnsson; c. 945–988), was a Viking leader who served as Jarl of Orkney, overseeing the Northern Isles from about 980 to 987. He is mentioned in the Orkneyinga saga, as well as in the sagas of Óláfr Tryggvason and St. Olaf. Beyond the saga records of Hlodvir, little verifiable information is known.

Hlodvir was the son of the Jarl Thorfinn Torf-Einarsson and Grelod, and he became jarl after the death of his brother, Ljot, who died from wounds suffered at the Battle of Skitten Mire.

In 959, Hlodvir married Eðnu, a descendant of Cerball mac Dúnlainge, king of Osraige, with whom he had one son, Sigurd the Stout, and at least two daughters: one who married the Hebridean chieftain Gilli, and another who married Hávarð, steward of Caithness.

Hlodvir died from an illness in 988 and was succeeded by his son, Sigurd II "the Stout". Hlodvir was buried in Höfn, Caithness, which is believed to be Huna, Scotland.

References

Hlodvir Thorfinnsson, Earl of Orkney
People from Orkney
Earls of Orkney
940s births
Year of birth uncertain
988 deaths
10th-century rulers in Europe
Orkneyinga saga characters